José Carlos Bauer (21 November 1925 – 4 February 2007), commonly known as Bauer, was a Brazilian football player and manager.

Early life
Born in São Paulo, he was the son of a Swiss man and an African-Brazilian woman. He was normally a defensive midfielder, Bauer was regarded as one of the finest Brazilian midfielders of his generation.

Career
In career he played for São Paulo and Botafogo. He won six São Paulo State Championship (1943, 1945, 1946, 1948, 1949 and 1953).

For Brazil national football team he played 29 matches, with five goals he won Copa América 1949 and participated at two FIFA World Cup finals, in 1950 and 1954. His last match in this tournament is famous Battle of Berne.

After he retired he managed Ferroviária de Araraquara. Curiously, in a trip of Ferroviária in Mozambique, Bauer saw a young Eusébio. Very impressed with him, Bauer indicated Eusébio to São Paulo, which denied him. Then, he talked with his former coach in São Paulo, Béla Guttmann, about Eusébio. Guttmann, who was coaching Benfica at the time,  brought him to the Estádio da Luz.

Death
He died on 4 February 2007, in São Paulo.

Honours

Club
São Paulo
Campeonato Paulista: 1945, 1946, 1948, 1949, 1953

Atlas
Copa México: 1962
Campeón de Campeones: 1962

International
Brazil
South American Championship: 1949
Panamerican Championship: 1952
FIFA World Cup Runner-up: 1950
South American Championship Runner-up: 1953

Individual
FIFA World Cup All-Star Team: 1950

References

External links
 

1925 births
2007 deaths
Brazilian people of Swiss descent
Brazilian footballers
Brazilian football managers
Expatriate football managers in Colombia
Expatriate football managers in Mexico
Footballers from São Paulo
Association football midfielders
1950 FIFA World Cup players
1954 FIFA World Cup players
Brazil international footballers
São Paulo FC players
Botafogo de Futebol e Regatas players
Associação Portuguesa de Desportos players
Esporte Clube São Bento players
Clube Atlético Juventus managers
Associação Ferroviária de Esportes managers
Atlas F.C. managers
Millonarios F.C. managers
Esporte Clube Comercial (MS) managers